Dariusz Dudek (born 8 April 1975 in Knurów) is a Polish football manager and former player, currently in charge of I liga club Zagłębie Sosnowiec.

Career
Dudek is a former player of such a teams like GKS Katowice, Widzew Łódź, Odra Wodzisław Legia Warsaw, FC Vitkovice. Besides being a professional footballer, he served in the military, as a marine.

He is the younger brother of former Liverpool and Real Madrid goalkeeper Jerzy Dudek.

References

External links
 
 Dariusz Dudek at Footballdatabase

1975 births
Living people
Sportspeople from Silesian Voivodeship
People from Knurów
Polish footballers
Association football defenders
GKS Katowice players
Widzew Łódź players
Legia Warsaw players
Odra Wodzisław Śląski players
MFK Vítkovice players
Ekstraklasa players
Polish football managers
Ekstraklasa managers
I liga managers
Zagłębie Sosnowiec managers
GKS Katowice managers
Sandecja Nowy Sącz managers
Polish expatriate footballers
Expatriate footballers in the Czech Republic
Polish expatriate sportspeople in the Czech Republic